Super key (❖) is an alternative and older name for what is commonly labelled as the Windows key or Command key on modern keyboards, typically bound and handled as such by Linux and BSD operating systems and software today. 

The Super key was originally a modifier key on a keyboard designed for Lisp machines at MIT.

History 

The "space-cadet" keyboard, designed in 1978 at MIT for the Lisp machine, introduced two new modifier keys, "Super" and "Hyper", compared to the earlier Knight keyboard also used with Lisp machines. Both keys became supported in the powerful Emacs text editor, which had, or would receive, influential ports on Multics, Unix, and many other operating systems, and saw wide adoption at institutions beyond MIT.

Primarily designed for use with (comparatively underpowered) personal computers, it lacked modifiers other than Ctrl, Alt, and Shift due to the limited usefulness of extended input ranges for DOS home computing.

Emacs commands using the Super key still presented a challenge, while the Hyper key commands gradually fell into disuse, with their keybindings being replaced by longer alternative bindings using combinations of other keys. 

In 1994 the  key first appeared on the popular Microsoft Natural Keyboard where it would serve to allow users to conveniently operate the Start menu on the upcoming Windows 95 without use of a mouse. It was in the same general location as the old workstation Super keys, in a space that the 101/102-key layout hadn't used. The subsequent proliferation of the Windows key as a part of the standard 104/105-key layout, coupled with its lack of specific purpose for operating systems with no Start menu, offered a new option to map another input modifier key expected in the Unix world. At first, around 1996, it was common practice to map the Meta key onto the Windows key. However, because of the existing alternate keys for Meta in Emacs, the reintroduction of a hardware Meta key binding did not prove exceptionally useful. This made Super the next most frequently emulated key of choice, and thus it became the standard assignment for the Windows key under X11.

Usage 
To avoid unauthorised usage of a Microsoft trademark, Unix and Linux free software documentation refer to the key as Super, and it appears as Super in, for instance, system interfaces displaying the current regional keymap. This may confuse some novice users who are only familiar with it as a Windows key, especially if their keyboard labels it as such. In some documentation such as for KDE Plasma, it is called the Meta key even though software has been updated to use the "Super" shift bit.

Most Linux graphical desktop environments use the Super key for window management and application launching, not only for commands used by applications. Much of this is similar to the use of the Windows key in the Windows operating system. In cases where a Unix keymap and a Windows keymap coincide, such as during the deployment of a Virtual Machine, a  keyboard event will be treated as equivalent to a  event, or vice versa, as needed.

In GNOME 3, letting go of the Super key defaults to showing the activities window.

In Openbox the Super key is an available modifier key, but is not used in any default shortcuts.

Under Unity, the key is used to control launcher and manage windows.

In Emacs, Super continues to be used for command keybindings, though currently none of the builtin commands use it by default.

In elementary OS, the Super key shows a shortcut overlay and is used for several system, window, and workspace functions.

In i3, the Super key along with Shift key are being used by default as modifiers used to control the behavior and layout of windows.

macOS 
X11 emulation on macOS puts the Super shift state on the Command or "Apple" key.

References 

Computer keys